Indian Springs is a census-designated place (CDP) in Catoosa County, Georgia, United States. The population was 2,336 at the 2020 census. It is part of the Chattanooga, TN–GA Metropolitan Statistical Area.

Geography

Indian Springs is located at  (34.959131, -85.163983).

Demographics

2020 census

As of the 2020 United States census, there were 2,336 people, 868 households, and 660 families residing in the CDP.

2000 census
As of the census of 2000, there were 1,982 people, 765 households, and 583 families residing in the CDP. The racial makeup of the CDP was 97.68% White, 0.45% African American, 0.96% Asian, 0.25% from other races, and 0.66% from two or more races. Hispanic or Latino of any race were 0.50% of the population.

There were 765 households, out of which 35.9% had children under the age of 18 living with them, 65.9% were married couples living together, 7.6% had a female householder with no husband present, and 23.7% were non-families. 20.4% of all households were made up of individuals, and 7.5% had someone living alone who was 65 years of age or older.  The average household size was 2.59 and the average family size was 2.99.

In the CDP, the population was spread out, with 25.8% under the age of 18, 6.6% from 18 to 24, 33.9% from 25 to 44, 22.9% from 45 to 64, and 10.8% who were 65 years of age or older.  The median age was 36 years. For every 100 females, there were 96.6 males.  For every 100 females age 18 and over, there were 92.5 males.

The median income for a household in the CDP was $45,399, and the median income for a family was $51,350. Males had a median income of $35,313 versus $22,031 for females. The per capita income for the CDP was $18,499.  About 7.9% of families and 11.1% of the population were below the poverty line, including 14.0% of those under age 18 and 18.6% of those age 65 or over.

References

Census-designated places in Catoosa County, Georgia
Census-designated places in Georgia (U.S. state)
Chattanooga metropolitan area